Road 79 is one of the major roads running north from Tehran, crossing over the Central Alborz mountain range, and down to the coast of the Caspian Sea in Iran. 

It route is within Tehran Province and Mazandaran Province.

See also

Central Alborz mountain range map

References

External links 

 Iran road map on Young Journalists Club

77
Transportation in Mazandaran Province
Transport in Tehran
Transportation in Tehran Province